Jazmin Duran is a Bolivian beauty pageant titleholder who was crowned Miss Earth Bolivia 2015, which gave her the right to represent Bolivia at Miss Earth 2015. She was born on May 15, 1994.

Biography

Miss Bolivia 2015
Jazmin joined the Miss Bolivia 2015 pageant, where she was hailed as Miss Earth Bolivia. At the same event, Paula Schneider was crowned Miss Bolivia Universo 2015, and Cochabamba's Alejandra Panozo won the title of Miss Bolivia International 2015. Joyce Prado was titled Miss Bolivia Tourism 2015, and Andrea Velazco was titled Miss Bolivia United Continents 2015.

Miss Earth 2015
Winning Miss Earth Bolivia for 2015, Jazmin was Bolivia's representative for Miss Earth 2015.

References

Living people
Bolivian beauty pageant winners
1994 births